Hober or  Höber is the surname of:

 Heinz Werner Höber (1931–1996), very prolific German pulp fiction novelist
 Marco Hober (born 1995), German footballer
 Rudolf Höber (1873–1953), German physician-investigator

See also
 Diny Hobers (born 1932), Dutch retired high jumper

German-language surnames